The 1983 Tulsa Golden Hurricane football team represented the University of Tulsa during the 1983 NCAA Division I-A football season. In their seventh year under head coach John Cooper, the Golden Hurricane compiled an 8–3 record (5–0 against conference opponents) and won the Missouri Valley Conference championship.

The team's statistical leaders included Steve Gage with 876 passing yards, Michael Gunter with 1,198 rushing yards, and John Green with 365 yards. Head coach John Cooper was later inducted into the College Football Hall of Fame.

Schedule

References

Tulsa
Tulsa Golden Hurricane football seasons
Missouri Valley Conference football champion seasons
Tulsa Golden Hurricane football